Dharmsinh Dadubhai Desai (30 October 1916 – 9 June 1980) was an Indian politician. He was elected to the Lok Sabha, lower house of the Parliament of India from Kheda , Gujarat as a member of the Indian National Congress. Dharamsinh Desai University was founded by him.

Dharmsinh Desai was great entrepreneur industrialist who founded APAR Group in year 1958. Today Apar Industries Ltd has become a billion dollar multinational company and operating in more than 100 countries worldwide.

Today APAR is third largest specialty oil company in India and number one ranked conductor manufacturing company.

References

External links
Official biographical sketch in Parliament of India website

India MPs 1971–1977
India MPs 1977–1979
Lok Sabha members from Gujarat
Indian National Congress politicians
1916 births
1980 deaths
Indian National Congress politicians from Gujarat